Russula albidula is a species of mushroom in the genus Russula.

References

External links

alutacea
Fungi of Europe